Bombardier Aerospace Emergency Services (Toronto) is responsible for fire and emergency services at Bombardier Aerospace's assembly and testing facility at Downsview Airport.

Station

There is one station that is located at the airport with apparatus stored in a shed near the end of Hanover Road.

Fleet

 2 Oshkosh Truck Corporation T-1500 airport crash tenders (1250/1250/210F)
 Dodge RAM fire prevention unit
 GMC Safari van fire marshall unit
 2 Toyota FJ Cruiser mobile response units
 Ford Windstar fire marshall van

See also

 Toronto City Centre Airport Emergency Response Services

References

 Bombardier Toronto
 Dehavilland Toronto

Fire departments in Ontario
Aircraft rescue and firefighting
Bombardier Aerospace
North York